Rossard is a surname. Notable people with the surname include:
	
Nicolas Rossard (born 1990), French volleyball player, cousin of Thibault
Olivier Rossard (born 1965), French volleyball player
Thibault Rossard (born 1993), French volleyball player